Longdon may refer to:

 Longdon, Staffordshire in Lichfield district
 Longdon, Worcestershire in Malvern Hills district
 Longdon-on-Tern, Shropshire
 Mount Longdon, East Falkland Island
 Longdon (surname)

See also
London (disambiguation)